Bogdan Araminowicz (9 October 1930 - 10 December 1987) was a former footballer who played as a midfielder.

Biography

He is documented to have played for Lechia Gdańsk from 1950 to 1952. He made his Lechia debut on 11 June 1950 in a 3-1 win against Bzura Chodaków in the II liga. In the following season, Lechia were in the Polish top division, I liga, where he made 11 league appearances. In total for Lechia he made 19 appearances, of which 14 were in the league. After football he worked in construction, attaining the position of Chief Construction Specialist. He died on 10 December 1987 aged 57, with his funeral taking place on 14 December. He is buried in the Srebrzysko Cemetery in Gdańsk.

References

1930 births
1987 deaths
Lechia Gdańsk players
Polish footballers
Association football midfielders